Pleasant Hill, also known as Antrim, is a ghost town in Houston County, Texas.  It was located approximately at the intersection of County Roads 2295 and 2290.

History 
The town's school, one of the first in the county, was organized in 1864. After the local railroad was built, most residents moved to Grapeland, and the town was empty by 1900.

Education 
Any residents that live in Antrim are zoned in the Elkhart Independent School District.

See also
List of ghost towns in Texas

References

Geography of Houston County, Texas
Ghost towns in East Texas